Picasso Nelson (born May 1, 1973) is a former American football linebacker who played two seasons in the Canadian Football League with the BC Lions and Edmonton Eskimos. He played college football at Jackson State University and attended Hattiesburg High School in Hattiesburg, Mississippi. He was also a member of the Houston Oilers, New York Giants and Toronto Argonauts.

College career
Nelson played for the Jackson State Tigers from 1992 to 1995. He was named the Southwest Athletic Conference defensive player of the year in 1995 after recording eight interceptions. He was also chosen for the Senior and Hula Bowl teams. He was inducted into the Jackson State University Sports Hall of Fame in 2009.

Professional career

Houston Oilers
Nelson was signed by the Houston Oilers on April 24, 1996 and was released by the team before the start of the 1996 season.

New York Giants
Nelson signed with the New York Giants on March 12, 1997. He was released by the Giants on August 12, 1997.

Toronto Argonauts
Nelson was signed by the Toronto Argonauts in March 1998. He was released by the Argonauts on June 27, 1998.

BC Lions
Nelson signed with the BC Lions on August 24, 1998 and played in ten games for the Lions during the 1998 season. He played in one game during the 1999 season before being released by the Lions on August 1, 1999.

Edmonton Eskimos
Nelson was signed by the Edmonton Eskimos on September 10, 1999. He was released by the Eskimos in February 2000.

Coaching career
Nelson was later an assistant coach for the Jones County Junior College Bobcats.

Personal life
Nelson's son Picasso Nelson, Jr. currently plays for the Arizona Cardinals; he played college football for the Southern Miss Golden Eagles. His nephew Kenny Shedd played in the National Football League.

References

External links
Just Sports Stats

Living people
1973 births
Players of American football from Mississippi
American football linebackers
Canadian football linebackers
African-American players of American football
African-American players of Canadian football
Jackson State Tigers football players
BC Lions players
Edmonton Elks players
Jones County Bobcats football coaches
Sportspeople from Hattiesburg, Mississippi
21st-century African-American sportspeople
20th-century African-American sportspeople